William Henry Fellowes, 2nd Baron de Ramsey (16 May 1848 – 8 May 1925), was a British Conservative politician.

De Ramsey was the eldest son of Edward Fellowes, 1st Baron de Ramsey, and Hon. Mary Julia Milles. Ailwyn Fellowes, 1st Baron Ailwyn, was his younger brother. He purchased a commission as a cornet in the Life Guards on 16 March 1867; he retired as a captain on 21 July 1877.

He succeeded his father as Member of Parliament for Huntingdonshire in 1880, a seat he held until 1885 when the constituency was abolished, and then represented Ramsey until August 1887, when he inherited the barony on his father's death and entered the House of Lords. In 1890 de Ramsey was appointed a Lord-in-waiting (government whip in the House of Lords) in the Conservative administration of Lord Salisbury, a post he held until the Conservative defeat in the 1892 general election.

Family
Lord de Ramsey married Lady Rosamond Jane Frances Spencer-Churchill, daughter of John Churchill, 7th Duke of Marlborough, in 1877. He thereby became the brother-in-law of Lord Randolph Churchill and the uncle (through marriage) of Winston Churchill. They had a London home in Grosvenor Square. Lady de Ramsey died in 1920. Lord de Ramsey survived her by five years and died in May 1925, aged 76. He was succeeded in the barony by his grandson Ailwyn, his son and heir apparent Captain the Hon. Coulson Churchill Fellowes having died on active service in the First World War.

Hon. Alexandra Frances Anne Fellowes (29 June 1880 – 16 September 1955), married Brig.-Gen. Hon. Ferdinand Charles Stanley
Hon. Coulson Churchill Fellowes (8 February 1883 – 22 October 1915), married first Gwendolen Dorothy Jefferson and secondly Hon. Lilah O'Brien
Ailwyn Fellowes, 3rd Baron de Ramsey (1910–1993)
Hon. Reginald Ailwyn Fellowes (20 January 1884 – 19 March 1953), married Marguerite Séverine Philippine Decazes de Glücksberg more usually known as Daisy Fellowes  
Hon. Gladys Cecil Georgina Fellowes (4 January 1885 – 4 August 1952), married Captain Heneage Greville Finch, Lord Guernsey
Hon. Hermione Frances Caroline Fellowes (31 July 1886 – January 1972), married 1. Brig.-Gen. Lord Esmé Charles Gordon-Lennox and secondly Rolf Cederström, Baron Cederström
Hon. Sybil Inna Mildred Fellowes (24 October 1888 – 18 May 1948), married James Butler, 5th Marquess of Ormonde

Notes

References

External links 

http://www.stirnet.com/ (subscription only)
 

1848 births
1925 deaths
Barons in the Peerage of the United Kingdom
Conservative Party (UK) Baronesses- and Lords-in-Waiting
Conservative Party (UK) MPs for English constituencies
UK MPs 1880–1885
UK MPs 1885–1886
UK MPs 1886–1892
UK MPs who inherited peerages
British Life Guards officers